Francis Joseph Bayldon MBE (1872–1948) was an Australian master mariner and nautical instructor.  Born in England, he was apprenticed to Devitt & Moore, and was an officer on their passenger ships, on a route that circled the globe, around the Cape of Good Hope and Cape Horn.  He was later with the Canadian-Australian Line, sailing between Vancouver and Sydney, Australia.  He was on the Burns Philp ship the Moresby in 1901–1902.

He helped correct nautical charts for Pacific navigation. Bayldon Shoals, near Tulagi in the Solomon Islands, is named for him.

He was a fellow of the Royal Australian Historical Society, and in 1925, published an article on the journeys of Luis Váez de Torres from the New Hebrides to the Moluccas. He was also a fellow of the Royal Geographical Society.  He was president of the local League of Ancient Mariners and vice-president of the Shiplovers' Society in Sydney.

References

1872 births
1948 deaths
Members of the Order of the British Empire
Australian explorers of the Pacific
Australian maritime historians